This list includes all major warships that entered service with the Argentine Navy since being formally established in the 1860s. It also includes ships that were purchased by Argentina but did not enter service under Argentine flag.  
The list does not include vessels prior to the 1860s; and it also excludes auxiliary ships (tugs, transports, colliers, tankers, scientific vessels, etc.) which are listed separately.

In addition, there is a separate list of ships currently in service with the Argentine Navy, regardless the type.

The list is organized by type of ship, by class within each type, and by entry date within each class. Service entry dates indicate the ship's commissioning into the Argentine Navy, and not the ship's entry in service with another navy unless specifically said.

Naming tradition 
The current norms establish naming conventions for Argentine Navy ships according to their type, some of them specific to warships are summarized below.

Destroyers, Frigates, Corvettes Naval heroes, or names of significantly historic ships.
Submarines Province names, with priority those starting with S.
Mine warfare ships Province names, not used by Submarines.
Amphibious warfare ships Coastal geographic features.
Fast attack ships Adjectives symbolizing qualities of combat ships.

List of ships

Aircraft carriers 

 (British-built)

Battleships 

Almirante Brown ironclad (British-built)

Libertad-class coastal battleships (British-built)

 dreadnoughts (US-built)

Monitors 

 (British-built)

Cruisers 

Patagonia protected cruiser (Austro-Hungarian-built)

Protected Elswick cruisers (British-built)

 Patria torpedo cruiser (British-built)

 armoured cruisers (Italian-built)

Ordered from Italian shipyards. Two ships, Rivadavia and Mariano Moreno, were sold to Japan prior to completion as per naval disarmament agreements with Chile.

Almirante Brown-class heavy cruisers (Italian-built)

La Argentina light cruiser (British-built)

ARA La Argentina was a light cruiser, designed for training naval cadets.

General Belgrano class (US )

Torpedo boats 

Maipu-class torpedo ram (British-built)

Bathurst class (British-built; Yarrow 1890 type - Mod GB TB 79 type)

Espora class (British-built)

1st class Thornycroft class (British-built)

2nd class Thornycroft class (British-built)

2nd class Yarrow class (British-built)

Riverine Yarrow class (British-built)

Destroyers 

  (British-built)

  (German-built)

 (German-built)

Eight other destroyers were ordered around this time but never entered service with the Argentine Navy.

 (Spanish-built)

Ordered by the Spanish Navy and sold to Argentina prior to completion.

 (British-built)

 (British-built)

Brown/Almirante Domecq García class (leased US )

Seguí class (modified US )

Py class (modified US )

Hércules class (British Type 42 destroyers)

 (German MEKO 360H2 type)

Frigates and corvettes 

 (Locally designed and built)

Hércules class (/-class World War II frigates)

República class

 (Locally designed and built)

 (French )

 (German MEKO 140A16 type, locally built)

Patrol, torpedo and fast attack craft 

 (Argentine-built)

 (German-built) - known as "fast craft" ( lánchas rápidas)

 (Israeli-built ) 

 (US-built )

Gunboats 

Paraná class (British-built) - also classified as "corvettes"

 
Constitución class (British-built) - locally classified as "bombarderas", they were of the Rendel gunboat type.

Bermejo class (British-built) - locally classified as "bombarderas", they were of the Rendel gunboat type.

 (British-built) - armoured river gunboats

Amphibious warfare 

Cabo San Bartolome class (ex-United States Landing Ship, Tank)

Cabo San Antonio class (Locally-built De Soto County)

Cándido de Lasala class (ex-United States)

Mine warfare 

Bathurst class (German-built M1915 and M1916 classes) 

Neuquén class (British-built )

 (Argentine-built minesweepers/minelayers)

Submarines 

By tradition, Argentine submarines bear the names of provinces whose names begin with the letter "S", thus, the pool of names is limited to only six ("Santa Fe", "Salta", "Santiago del Estero", "San Luis", "San Juan" and "Santa Cruz") resulting in repeated class and ship names.

Santa Fe (1) class (Italian-built Tarantinos)

Santa Fe (2) class (US-built )

Santa Fe (3) class (US-built Guppy class)

Salta class (German-built Type 209)

Santa Cruz class (German-built TR-1700 type)

Six of these ships were planned by the Navy. Only the first two, built in Germany, were actually completed. The other four, to be built in Argentina, were never completed due to budgetary concerns.

Sailing warships 

La Argentina class (Austria-Hungary-built) formally classified as a sailing corvette

Presidente Sarmiento class (British-built)

Footnotes

See also 

 List of auxiliary ships of the Argentine Navy

References

Notes

Bibliography 

 ARA official website – Surface Fleet Naval ships in fleet service. (accessed 2009-09-30)
 HISTARMAR - Indice Armada Argentina Argentine Navy Index. (accessed 2015-01-15)

Further reading 

 Burzaco, Ricardo and Ortiz, Patricio. Acorazados y Cruceros de la Armada Argentina, 1881–1992. Buenos Aires: Eugenio B. Ediciones, 1997. . .

External links 
 

Lists of ships of Argentina